Mykola Valeriyovych Butsenko (born 25 June 1991) is a Ukrainian amateur boxer who competes in the -56 kg weight division. In the quarterfinals of the 2013 AIBA World Boxing Championships he defeated Selçuk Eker of Turkey to win his 1st medal at the World Championships. He is also a two-time European silver medalist. He participated at the 2016 Summer Olympscs where he lost his first bout against Mohamed Hamout from Morocco.

References

External links 
 
 
 
 

1991 births
Living people
Sportspeople from Odesa
Ukrainian male boxers
Olympic boxers of Ukraine
Boxers at the 2016 Summer Olympics
AIBA World Boxing Championships medalists
European Games medalists in boxing
European Games silver medalists for Ukraine
Boxers at the 2019 European Games
Bantamweight boxers
Boxers at the 2020 Summer Olympics